The National Rail Museum in Chanakyapuri, New Delhi, displays exhibits on the history of rail transport in India. The museum was inaugurated on 1 February 1977. The museum spans over an area of over 11 acres and the indoor gallery comprises an octagonal building which houses six display galleries and a large open area is laid out to simulate the atmosphere of a railway yard. It is open every day except Mondays and national holidays.

History

A Transport Museum was first proposed in 1962, under the advice of rail enthusiast Michael Graham Satow. The proposal took a concrete shape in 1970 and on 7 October 1971 the foundation stone was laid at the museum's present site in Chanakyapuri, New Delhi, by the then-President of India, V. V. Giri. The museum was inaugurated as the Rail Transport Museum in 1977 by Kamalapati Tripathi, the minister for public transportation.

The museum was originally intended to be a part of a larger museum that covered the history of railways, roadways, airways, and waterways in India; however, this never happened and it was officially renamed the National Rail Museum in 1995.

Facilities

Auditorium: The museum has a state of the art auditorium with seating capacity of 200 persons.

VIP Lounge: The museum has a state of the art air-conditioned conference hall with seating capacity of 20-25 persons.

The Rails: The Rails is a restaurant situated in the museum. It is housed in a replica the Chhatrapati Shivaji Terminus main building. The restaurant depicts the formation of Indian Railways through unification of 42 independent railway companies held by the princely states of India and British East Indian Company. The Maharaja of Gwalior had a silver model train that ran along the banquet table and served food to the royal guests. The restaurant replicates this by making a steam locomotive chug around the restaurant and serve food at tables named after historic stations in the country.

Souvenir shop: There is a souvenir shop where small scale models of rolling stock, books, apparels, frame and prints, etc. are available for sale.

Exhibits

 Patiala State Monorail Trainways: This unique steam monorail was built in 1907. This unique train system consists of a single-rail track on which the load-carrying wheel runs, while large iron wheels on either side keep the train upright. The train was built by Orenstein & Koppel of Berlin and ran until October 1927 when the line was closed. The engine and the chief engineer's inspection car remained in the railways' scrapyard where they were discovered by railroad historian Mike Satow in 1962. One of the engines was restored to full working order by the Northern Railway Workshops in Amritsar. The Chief Engineer's private inspection car was also reconstructed on an old under-frame. The two are now in working condition and are on display at the museum.

 Fairy Queen: The world's oldest working steam locomotive in operational service. It is taken out on heritage runs several times a year. 

 John Morris-Belsize Fire Engine: built by the fire engineers John Morris and Sons Salford/John Morris and Sons Ltd of Salford, Greater Manchester, on a Belsize chassis, in 1914. The only other John Morris-Belsize fire-engine known to exist is a larger 6 cylinder model which is preserved by the Whitewebbs Museum of Transport, Enfield. London. This is in full working order - it was converted to use pneumatic tyres,(as this was required by British traffic regulations in the early 1930s), whilst the fire engine in Delhi runs on the original type of solid rubber tyres.

 Electric locomotive 4502 Sir Leslie Wilson: This 1928 WCG-1 locomotive belonged to the Great Indian Peninsular Railway (presently Central Railway). It is one of India's first generation 1,500 V DC electric locomotives, which were known as khakis (English: crabs) since they make a curious moaning sound when at rest, and while in motion the linkage emits an unusual swishing sound. Its unusual features included an articulated body, which made it ideal for use in heavily curved sections of the Ghat mountains. The WCG-1 was in operation as a shunting locomotive until 1994 at Mumbai's Chhatrapati Shivaji Terminus.

 Electric locomotive 4006 Sir Roger Lumley: This WCP-1 locomotive has unique wheel arrangements. These locomotives were supplied by the Vulcan Foundry, UK, in 1930.  They were electric locomotives operating under 1,500 V DC. They are known for hauling the Mumbai–Pune Deccan Queen Express in its early years. A prototype of this locomotive is also on display at the Nehru Science Centre in Mumbai.

 Fireless steam locomotive 
 Steam locomotive A885 HASANG 
 Steam locomotive X37385: This locomotive was used for trains to Ooty.
 Betty Tramways (Fowler Diesel): This locomotive ran in Rajkot and was owned by Rajkot-Beti Tramways.
 Saloon of The Prince of Wales: This saloon car was built for the Prince of Wales (later King Edward VII) for his visit to India.
 Saloon of The Maharaja of Indore: This was the saloon car of Maharaja of Indore.
 Saloon of The Maharaja of Mysore: This was the saloon car of the Maharaja of Mysore. The saloon is designed using teak, gold, ivory, and other materials.
 Crane tank

See also

 Rewari Railway Heritage Museum
 Regional Railway Museum, Chennai
 Railway Museum Mysore
 Railway Heritage Centre, Tiruchirappalli
 Joshi's Museum of Miniature Railway

References

External links

Official Museum Website
Article on National Rail Museum, Delhi by Rangan Datta
An Enthusiasts site
Photographic tour

1977 establishments in Delhi
Museums established in 1977
Museums in Delhi
National railway museums
New Delhi